The Crossing (Guo chun tian; lit. "Passing the Spring") is a Chinese drama film, directed by Bai Xue and released in 2018. The film stars Yao Huang as Peipei, a shy teenager in Shenzhen attending school in Hong Kong, who gets drawn into smuggling black market smartphones in the hopes of saving money to fund her dream of travelling to Japan.

The film premiered in September 2018 at the 2018 Toronto International Film Festival, and had its Chinese premiere in October at the Pingyao International Film Festival. It went into commercial release in 2019.

Awards
At TIFF, the film received an honorable mention for the NETPAC Prize. At Pingyao, it won the award for Best Film, and Yao Huang won the award for Best Actress.

At the 13th Asian Film Awards in 2019, Bai Xue was nominated for Best New Director and Yao Huang was nominated for Best Newcomer.

References

External links

2018 films
2018 drama films
Chinese drama films
2010s Cantonese-language films